Tuija Sisko Annele Toivonen-Jousimaa (born 22 September 1958) is a retired female long-distance runner from Elimäki, Finland. She competed in the women's marathon for her native country at two consecutive Summer Olympics, starting in 1984. Her best result was the 10th place at the 1984 Summer Olympics in Los Angeles, California. Toivonen set her personal best in the classic distance in 1991, clocking 2:28:59.

Achievements

References
 sports-reference

1958 births
Living people
People from Elimäki
Finnish female long-distance runners
Olympic athletes of Finland
Athletes (track and field) at the 1984 Summer Olympics
Athletes (track and field) at the 1988 Summer Olympics
Sportspeople from Kymenlaakso